The following lists events that happened during 2022 in Central America.

Incumbents

Belize 

 Chief of state: Queen Elizabeth II (until September 8) Charles III onwards
 Represented by Governor-General Dame Froyla Tzalam
 Head of Government: Prime Minister Johnny Briceno (starting 2020)

Costa Rica 

 Chief of state and Head of Government: President Carlos Alvarado Quesada (until May 7, 2018) Rodrigo Chaves Robles onwards
 First Vice President Stephan Brunner; (since 2022)
 Second Vice President Mary Munive (since 2022)

El Salvador 

 Chief of state and Head of Government: President Nayib Bukele Ortez (since 2019)
 Vice President Felix Augusto Antonio Ulloa Garay (since 2019)

Guatemala 

 

 Chief of state and Head of government: President Alejandro Eduardo Giammattei Falla (since 2020)
 Vice-president César Guillermo Castillo Reyes (since 2020)

Honduras 

 

 Chief of state and Head of Government: President Xiomara Castro (since 2022)
 Vice Presidents: Salvador Nasralla, Doris Gutiérrez, Renato Florentino (since 2022)

Nicaragua 

 

 Chief of state and Head of government: President Daniel Ortega (since 2007)
 Vice President Rosario Murillo Zambrana (since 2017)

Panama 

 

 Chief of state and Head of Government: President Laurentino "Nito" Cortizo Cohen (since 2019)
 Vice President Jose Gabriel Carrizo Jaen (since 2019)

Events

Elections 

 6 February: 2022 Costa Rican general election

Holidays

January to March 

January 1 – New Year's Day
January 9 – Martyrs' Day (Panama)
February 14–15 – Carnival, Public holidays in Panama
March 2 – Ash Wednesday, Panama
March 7 –  National Heroes & Benefactors Day, Belize.
March 14 – Commonwealth Day, Belize

April to June 

April 14 – Holy Thursday, Costa Rica
April 15 – Good Friday
April 16 – Holy Saturday
April 18 – Easter Monday
April 11 – Juan Santamaría Day, Costa Rica
April 14 – Pan American Day, Honduras
May 1 – Labour Day, International Workers' Day
June 30 – Army Day, Public holidays in Guatemala

July to September 

July 19 – Sandinista Revolution Day, Public holidays in Nicaragua
July 25 – Guanacaste Day, Costa Rica
August 2 – Virgin of Los Angeles Day, Costa Rica
August 3 – Fiesta of San Salvador, celebrated in El Salvador
September 10 – Saint George's Caye Day, Belize
September 14 – San Jacinto Day, Nicaragua
September 15/20 – Act of Independence of Central America, independence from Spain in 1821; celebrated in Costa Rica, El Salvador, Guatemala, Honduras Nicaragua
September 21 – Independence Day, Belize

October to December 

October 7 – Francisco Morazán′s Birthday, Honduras
October 21  – Armed Forces of Honduras Day 
October 12 – Pan America Day, Belize
October 20 – Guatemalan Revolution Day
November 1 – All Saints' Day, celebrated in Guatemala
November 3 – Separation Day (from Colombia, 1903), Panama
November 4 – Flag of Panama Day 
November 5 – Colón Day, Panama
November 10 – Los Santos Uprising Day, Panama
November 19 – Garifuna Settlement Day, Belize
November 29 – Independence Day, Panama
December 8 – Feast of the Immaculate Conception, Nicaragua Panama
December 25 – Christmas Day
December 27 – Boxing Day, Belize

Sports 

 26 July - November 3: 2022 CONCACAF League

Deaths 

 February 10 – Manuel Esquivel, Prime minister of Belize (1984-1989)

See also 

2022 in the Caribbean
COVID-19 pandemic in North America
2020s
2020s in political history
Central American Parliament
2022 Atlantic hurricane season

References

External links 

El Universal (Mexico) in English
Al Jazeera (Latin America) in English
Associated Press (Latin America)
Amandala (Belize)

 
2020s in Central America
Years of the 21st century in Central America